The Women's Discus Throw F35-36 had its Final held on September 9 at 9:35.

Medalists

Results

References
Final

Athletics at the 2008 Summer Paralympics
2008 in women's athletics